East Harling is a village in the English county of Norfolk.

History
East Harling's name is of Anglo-Saxon origin and derives from the Old English for the eastern part of the settlement of 'Herela's' people.

From 1808 to 1814, East Harling hosted a station in the shutter telegraph chain connecting the Admiralty in London to the fleet in Great Yarmouth.

Geography
East Harling falls within the constituency of South West Norfolk, represented at Parliament by Liz Truss of the Conservative Party. For the purposes of local government, the parish falls within the district of Breckland.

Church of St Peter and St Paul

East Harling's parish church is dedicated to Saint Peter and Saint Paul and was built in its current glory on the site of an earlier church during the 15th century from the fortune of Anne Harling, an orphan of the Hundred Years War. The church is Grade I listed and has a magnificent hammerbeam roof which rises to a height of 45 feet above the floor. The building contains many other medieval survivals such as the panels of the chancel screen, an older screen surrounding the Lady Chapel with intricate carvings in its spandrels, choir stalls in the chancel, remains of a mural and the octagonal font. There are also a number of interesting tombs. The most noteworthy feature of the church, however, is the magnificent east window which was donated to the church by Lady Anne Herling and her second husband, Sir Robert Wingfield, in around 1460. The glass was removed and hidden in the since demolished East Harling Hall for fear of destruction by Puritan iconoclasts. The glass was restored in 1736 under the direction of Thomas Wright and has stood in its current position since, excepting during the Second World War.

Transport
Harling Road railway station opened in 1845 as a stop on the Norwich & Brandon Railway, the station remains open to this day on the Breckland Line between Cambridge and Norwich.

War memorial
East Harling's war memorial takes the form of a stone obelisk featuring a sword of sacrifice upon a Celtic cross at the junction between Cheese Hill, Market Street and White Hart Street. The memorial lists the following names for the First World War:
 Company-Sergeant-Major Henry R. Pattinson (d.1917), 1/4th Battalion, Royal Norfolk Regiment
 Lance-Corporal Walter E. Endley (1893-1915), 1/4th Battalion, Royal Norfolk Regiment
 Lance-Corporal Stephen A. Miller (1895-1915), 1/4th Battalion, Royal Norfolk Regiment
 Private George T. Tyler (d.1915), 7th Battalion, Australian Imperial Force
 Private Herbert Secker (1894-1916), 2nd Battalion, Bedfordshire Regiment
 Private Horace B. Howlett (1875-1915), 8th (Winnipeg Rifles) Battalion, Canadian Expeditionary Force
 Private R. J. Richards (d.1916), 1st Battalion, Essex Regiment
 Private Oliver Bullman (1889-1918), 2nd Battalion, Essex Regiment
 Private Harry V. Barnard (1899-1918), 17th Battalion, Royal Fusiliers
 Private Sidney B. Sparkes (1891-1916), 4th Battalion, Grenadier Guards
 Private C. Harbour (d.1918), Machine Gun Corps
 Private G. Zachariah Barnard (1892-1917), 1/4th Battalion, Royal Norfolk Regiment
 Private Fearnley Askey (1887-1917), 8th Battalion, Royal Norfolk Regiment
 Private Frederick G. Elvin (d.1917), 8th Battalion, Royal Norfolk Regiment
 Private William I. Pinner (1885-1916), 9th Battalion, Royal Norfolk Regiment
 Private E. W. Germany (d.1917), 2nd Battalion, Northamptonshire Regiment
 Private Derek St Clair Everett (1896-1916), 1/5th Battalion, Northumberland Fusiliers
 Private Herbert William Barnard (d.1918), 2nd Battalion, Suffolk Regiment
 Rifleman Arthur H. Bloomfield (1889-1917), 9th Battalion, Royal Irish Rifles
 Rifleman Frederick F. Beales (1899-1918), 12th Battalion, King's Royal Rifle Corps
 Rifleman H. E. Alderton (d.1916), 17th (Poplar and Stepney Rifles) Battalion, London Regiment
 Rifleman J. R. Osborne (d.1918), 18th (London Irish Rifles) Battalion, London Regiment
 Rifleman Harry E. Buck (d.1918), 4th New Zealand Rifle Brigade, New Zealand Expeditionary Force
 Rifleman Charles H. Glover (1891-1916), 3rd New Zealand Rifle Brigade, New Zealand Expeditionary Force
 Seaman G. B. Bean (d.1918), S.S. Cufic
 E. D. Bateman
 J. T. Bean
 W. R. Brown
 R. J. Frost
 J. J. Hunt
 J. Osborne
 P. Richards
 J. Shaw
 H. J. Smith
 T. Smith
 J. H. Tyler

And, the following for the Second World War:
 Sub-Lieutenant Barry P. Grigson (1920-1940), 825 Naval Air Squadron
 Sergeant Cyril W. Kerridge (1913-1941), Royal Air Force
 Aircraftman-Second-Class Kenneth E. Frost (1922-1944), No. 2795 Squadron, RAF Regiment
 Corporal William G. Osborne (d.1944), 4th Battalion, Royal Norfolk Regiment
 Gunner Derek J. Bloomfield (1921-1944), 71st (Heavy) Anti-Aircraft Regiment, Royal Artillery
 Private Harold A. Walker (1908-1939), 4th Battalion, Royal Norfolk Regiment
 R. C. Barnard
 J. Cross
 C. W. Hall
 W. F. Lake
 J. Shingfield
 E. C. Wix

References

External links

Information from Genuki Norfolk on East Harling.
Archived version of village website

Breckland District
Villages in Norfolk